Costus is a group of herbaceous perennial plants in the family Costaceae, described by Linnaeus as a genus in 1753. It was formerly known as Hellenia after the Finnish botanist Carl Niclas von Hellens. It is widespread through tropical and subtropical regions of Asia, Africa, and the Americas.

Costus is often characterized and distinguished from relatives such as Zingiber (true ginger) by its spiraling stems. The genus as a whole is thus often called spiral gingers, but this can also refer to C. barbatus specifically.

Costus spectabilis is the floral emblem of Nigeria; its flowers are represented (erroneously in red instead of yellow color) on its coat of arms. 
It is important not to confuse Costus speciosus, C. spectabilis etc. with the herb known by the common name "costus".

Some species are of importance to herbivores, such as caterpillars of the restricted demon (Notocrypta curvifascia) which feed on Costus speciosus (crêpe ginger). The crêpe ginger is also a source of diosgenin, a compound used for the commercial production of various steroids, such as progesterone. In Trinidad and Tobago, a mix of Costus scaber juice and crushed Renealmia alpinia berries is used to treat dogs bitten by snakes.

Species

 Formerly placed here
Numerous other species have been called Costus over the years, but are now regarded as members of other genera. Such genera include Alpinia, Amomum, Caulokaempferia, Cheilocostus, Chamaecostus, Dimerocostus, Hellenia, Paracostus, Renealmia, Tapeinochilos, etc.

Gallery

References

 
Zingiberales genera